The kokoshnik is a traditional Russian  headdress worn by women and girls to accompany the sarafan. The kokoshnik tradition has existed since the 10th century in the ancient Russian city Veliky Novgorod. It spread primarily in the northern regions of Russia and was very popular from 16th to 19th century. It is still to this day an important feature of Russian dance ensembles and folk culture and inspired the Kokoshnik style of architecture.

Overview
Historically a kokoshnik is a headdress worn by married women, though maidens also wore a headdress very similar to a kokoshnik, but open in the back, named a povyazka. The word kokoshnik describes a great variety of headdresses worn throughout Russia, including the cylindrical hats of Veliky Novgorod, two-pointed nimbus kika of Vladimir, triangular kika of Kostroma, small pearl hats of Kargopol, and scarlet kokoshniks of Moscow.

While in the past kokoshnik styles varied greatly, currently a kokoshnik is generally associated with a tall, nimbus or crest shaped headdress which is tied at the back of the head with long thick ribbons in a large bow. The crest can be embroidered with pearls and goldwork or simple applique, usually using plant and flower motifs. The forehead area is frequently decorated with pearl netting. While wearing a kokoshnik the woman usually wears her hair in a plait. The kokoshnik were often also combined with the Russian braid.

History 

The word kokoshnik first appears in 16th-century documents, and comes from the Old Slavic kokosh, which means  "hen" or "cockerel". However, the earliest head-dress pieces of similar type (rigid cylindrical hat which completely covered the hair) were found in the 10th- to 12th-century burials in Veliky Novgorod.

The kokoshnik gave its name to the decorative corbel arch that became a distinctive element of traditional Russian architecture from the 16th century onwards (see kokoshnik architecture).

During the revival of Russian national culture in the early 19th century, diadem-shaped tiaras became part of the official court dress for royalty and for ladies-in-waiting. These "kokoshniks" were inspired just as much by Italian Renaissance fashions and by the french hood as by the authentic Russian kokoshniks still worn by the middle class and wealthy peasants of the time. In this period both unmarried and married women wore the variety used traditionally by unmarried women: showing the front part of the hair, and with a translucent veil falling down the back.

After the  1917 Revolution, Russian émigrés popularized the kokoshnik within European fashion. The style had previously appeared in the 1893 wedding head-dress of Mary of Teck, the future Queen consort of the United Kingdom.

Queen Marie of Romania wore a Cartier tiara created to resemble the Russian kokoshnik for her 1924 portrait painted by Philip de László. The tiara was among the jewels on display in the "Cartier: Style and History" exhibition at the Grand Palais in Paris from December 4 through February 16, 2014.

One of the costumes of Senator Padmé Amidala in the Star Wars saga, the Gold Travel Costume, was based on the Russian national costume with kokoshnik, known in the rest of Europe from the photographs taken during the 1903 Ball in the Winter Palace.

Some fans of Russia at the 2018 FIFA World Cup wore simple versions of kokoshniki. In recent years kokoshniki made out of flowers have become popular. Kokoshniki are a popular Russian souvenir.

Gallery

See also
 Sarafan
 Ryasna

Similar headgear in other cultures
 Ochipok, Ukrainian
 Fontange
 Fengguan, Chinese
 French hood
 Barbette
 Hennin
 Gable hood
 Liangbatou, Chinese

References

External links

 

16th-century fashion
17th-century fashion
18th-century fashion
19th-century fashion
Headgear
Russian folk clothing
Russian inventions